Henblas may refer to:
 Henblas, Anglesey, a village with an eponymous Grade II* listed house
 Henblas Burial Chamber, a Neolithic dolmen
 Henblas, Llanasa, Flintshire, a Grade I listed house
 Henblas, Llangedwyn, Powys, a Grade II* listed house
 Henblas, Tremeirchion, Denbighshire, a Grade II* listed house